Progonadoliberin-2 is a protein that in humans is encoded by the GNRH2 gene.

The protein encoded by this gene is a preproprotein that is cleaved to form a secreted 10 aa peptide hormone, QHWSHGWYPG. The secreted decapeptide regulates reproduction in females by stimulating the secretion of both luteinizing- and follicle-stimulating hormones. Three transcript variants that encode unique proproteins but the same peptide hormone have been found for this gene. The peptide belongs to gonadotropin-releasing hormone family.

References

Further reading

Precursor proteins